Maud is an unincorporated community in Wetzel County, West Virginia, United States. Its post office has been closed.

References 

Unincorporated communities in West Virginia
Unincorporated communities in Wetzel County, West Virginia